William Haywood may refer to:

 Bill Haywood (William Dudley Haywood, 1869–1928), American union leader
 William Henry Haywood Jr. (1801–1852), North Carolina senator
 William Haywood (architect) (1876–1957), British architect and town planner
 William Haywood (cricketer) (1841–1912), British cricketer
 William Haywood (engineer) (1821–1894), British Surveyor and Engineer to the City of London Commissioners of Sewers
 Bill Haywood (baseball) (born 1937), American baseball former pitcher, coach and manager

See also
 William Hayward (disambiguation)